Trivero (Piedmontese: Tarvè) was a comune (municipality) in the Province of Biella in the Italian region Piedmont, located about  northeast of Turin and about  northeast of Biella.

Physical geography 
Trivero bordered the following municipalities: Camandona, Caprile, Crevacuore, Curino, Mezzana Mortigliengo, Mosso, Portula, Pray, Scopello, Soprana, Strona, Vallanzengo, Valle Mosso, Valle San Nicolao.

As a comune it had the following frazioni (villages): Pratrivero, Ponzone, Cereje, Polto, Barbero, Sella, Lora, Guala, Ronco, Mazza, Mazzucco, Vaudano, Botto, Pramorisio, Piana, Castello, Fila, Dosso, Grillero, Pellizaro, Vico, Oro, Ferrero, Gioia, Roveglio, Villaggio Residenziale, Bellavista, Caulera, Stavello, Barbato, S. Antonio, Barozzo, Marone Bulliana, Giardino

History 
Trivero is an important centre of the wool industry. The Italian fashion companies Ermenegildo Zegna and Loro Piana were born in Trivero.

From 1 January 2019 Trivero was absorbed by the new-born municipality of Valdilana.

Demographic evolution

See also 

 Nostra Signora della Brughiera

References